Kalyna Roberge (born October 1, 1986) is a Canadian short track speed skater.

Born in Saint-Étienne-de-Lauzon, Quebec, Roberge has won a gold medal in the 3000m relay at the 2005 World Championships. She also placed third overall at the 2005 World Junior Championships including a gold medal  in the 500m. She also won a gold medal at a World Cup event in the Netherlands in the 3000m relay. At the 2006 Winter Olympics, Roberge placed fourth in the 500m. Along with Alanna Kraus, Tania Vicent and Anouk Leblanc-Boucher, Roberge won a silver medal in the 3000m relay.

She skated for Canada at the 2010 Winter Olympics. On February 24, she won a silver medal in the 3000 metre relay, along with Jessica Gregg, Tania Vicent and Marianne St-Gelais.

Career

See also
List of Canadian sports personalities

References

External links
Profile of Kalyna Roberge by the CBC

1986 births
Black Canadian sportswomen
Canadian female short track speed skaters
French Quebecers
Living people
Olympic short track speed skaters of Canada
Olympic silver medalists for Canada
Short track speed skaters at the 2006 Winter Olympics
Short track speed skaters at the 2010 Winter Olympics
Sportspeople from Quebec
Olympic medalists in short track speed skating
Canadian female speed skaters
Medalists at the 2010 Winter Olympics
Medalists at the 2006 Winter Olympics
21st-century Canadian women